Osman Islambayuly Batur (Ospan Batyr, وسپان باتىر; ;  (Osman the Bandit); Mongolian:  sometimes spelled as Uthmān/Osman Bātūr, Osman Batir or Osman Bahadur; 1899 – April 29, 1951), the son of Islambay, was a Chinese warlord of Kazakh origin.

Biography
He was born in 1899 in Öngdirkara in the Köktogay region of Altay (Koktokay County, Altay Prefecture, Xinjiang, China) as Osman Islamuly, and "Batur" is an honorific title that stands for 'brave'.  He is the son of İslâm Bey, a farmer of middle class from Altay Kazakhs.  The nomadic kazakh grew up living his life.  Osman Batur, who was a good rider and a master hunter before the age of 10, learned the fine arts of martial arts from Böke Batur, a Kazakh, with whom he entered his service at the age of 12.  Boke Boke Baturin Baturin then be defeated by the Chinese over Tibet after the decapitation of captured while trying to reach Turkey birthplace at the age of 40 were engaged in farming.  In 1940, as the Chinese administration increased the pressure, he took his gun and went to the mountain alone.  He continued the struggle he started alone until his execution in Urumqi on 29 April 1951.

Osman began his struggle against the Chinese and Russians in 1941, aimed to liberate all Altai lands and East Turkestan from the Chinese and Russians.  During World War II, with the increasing pressure on the Turks in East Turkestan, the reaction movements gained strength and prepared the ground for the rise of Osman Batur.

Osman Batur, who started to clean the Altays from the Chinese, seemed to have reached his goal in 1943.  With a ceremony held in Bulgun on July 22, 1943, the inn of Osman Batur Altay Kazakhs was declared.  By 1945, except for a few cities in East Turkestan, the control was taken by the Turks.  When the situation became intolerable and dangerous for the Chinese, the Chinese armies carried out harsh and intense operations in the region.  Although Osman Batur, who was removed from Targabatay and Altays, started the fight with thirty thousand people, by 1950 this number was approximately four thousand.  There was also a struggle between Alibek Hakim and his comrades.

Osman Batur, who was trapped in Kanambal in 1951, was captured and taken to Urumqi.

In Xinjiang he led the Kazakh people to fight against PRC. He was captured in Hami (Eastern Xinjiang), circulated and executed in Urumqi on April 29, 1951, his hands and feet were cut off, after resisting the Communist takeover. His children were captured, tortured and killed by the Chinese and his wife lost her mind due to this and jumped in to a fast flowing  river. After his death many of his followers fled over the Himalayan mountains. Afterwards they were airlifted to Turkey, where they then lived.

The conflict at Baitag Bogd 
The East Turkestan Republic was not united. There was a split in the government, two groups fought. The leaders of individual districts and units showed separatism. This was especially pronounced in the actions of one of the most striking "field commanders" of Ospan-Batyr (Osman-Batyr) of Islam. In the 1930s, he was a little-known gang leader. In 1940, Ospan became one of the leaders of the Kazakh uprising in the Altai district against Governor General Sheng Shitsai. The uprising was caused by the decision of the authorities to transfer the pastures and watering places to the settled peasants - Dungans and Chinese. In 1943, Altai Kazakhs rebelled again due to the decision of the authorities to relocate them to the south of Xinjiang, and place Chinese refugees in their nomads. After Ospan meets with Choibalsan, leader of the Mongolian People’s Republic weapons rebels supplied the MPR. In the spring of 1944, Osman Batyr was forced to retreat to Mongolia. Moreover, the departure of his unit was covered by the air forces of the MPR and the USSR. In the fall of 1945, the Osman-Batyr detachment took part in the liberation of the Altai District from the Kuomintang. After that, Ospan-Batyr was appointed by the Government of the WTR Governor of the Altai District.

However, such a high position did not satisfy the rebel commander. Disputes immediately began between him and the WTR government. The Altai governor refused to comply with the instructions of the leadership of the republic, and his troops did not obey the command of the army. In particular, when the WTR army suspended military operations against the Kuomintang troops (the WTR leadership accepted the proposal to start negotiations with the aim of creating a single coalition government in Xinjiang), the Ospan-Batyr detachments not only failed to comply with this instruction, but, on the contrary, intensified their activities. At the same time, his gangs were smashed and plundered not only by the Kuomintang units and wagons, but also by the villages controlled by the VTR. It was not for nothing that Stalin called the Ospan-Batyr "a social bandit."

Ospan himself hatched plans to create the Altai Khanate, completely independent of the WTR and China, hoping for support from Mongolia. This caused concern for Moscow. The head of the NKVD, Beria, turned to Molotov with a request to coordinate actions against this Kazakh Robin Hood with Marshal MPR Choibalsan. However, attempts by the command of the army and the leadership of the WTR, Soviet representatives and personally Choibalsan to reason the rebellious commander did not succeed. In 1946, referring to the disease, he left the post of governor, returned to the free life of the “field commander”. Robbed the settlements that were part of the WTR.

At the end of 1946, Ospan took the side of the Kuomintang authorities and received the post of specially authorized Xinjiang government in the Altai District. He became one of the most dangerous enemies of the WTR and the MPR. At the beginning of June 1947, a detachment of Ospan-Batyr of several hundred fighters, with the support of Kuomintang army units, invaded the territory of Mongolia in the Baitag-Bogd region. Ospan's bandits destroyed the border outpost and invaded the depths of the MPR. On June 5, Mongol troops approached with the support of the Soviet aviation knocked out the enemy. Then the Mongols invaded Xinjiang, but were defeated in the area of ​​the Chinese outpost of Betashan. Subsequently, both sides exchanged several raids; skirmishes continued until the summer of 1948. After the Baitag-Bogd incident, Beijing and Moscow exchanged notes with mutual accusations and protests.

Ospan remained on the side of the Kuomintang government, received reinforcements by people, weapons, ammunition, and in the fall of 1947 fought in the Altai District with the troops of the World Trade Organization. He was even able to temporarily capture the capital of Shara-Sume County. The authorities of the republic had to carry out additional mobilization. Soon, Ospan-Batyr was defeated and fled east. In 1949, the Kuomintang in China were defeated. The Communists defeated and occupied Xinjiang. Ospan rebelled against the new government. In 1950, the rebellious leader was caught and executed.

See also

 Kazakh exodus from Xinjiang

Sources

 Godfrey Lias, Kazak Exodus, London: Evan Brothers Limited (1956)
 Justin Jacobs, "The many deaths of a Kazak unaligned", American Historical Review 115.5 (2010), pp. 1291–1314.              
 Halife Altay, Anayurttan Anadoluʹya, Ankara: Kültür Bakanlığı, 1981 (Turkish)
 Halife Altay, Kazak Türklerine aid şecere, Istanbul, 1997 (Turkish)
 Gülçin Çandarlıoğlu, Özgürlük Yolu, Nurgocay Batur'un Anılarıyla Osman Batur, Istanbul: Doğu Kütüphanesi, 2006 (Turkish)
 Zordun Sabir, Anayurt, Almaty: Nash Mir, 2006 (Uyghur)
 Hızır Bek Gayretullah, Osman Batur,  (Turkish)
 Hızır Bek Gayretullah, Altaylarda Kanlı Günler, 1977 (Turkish)

1899 births
1951 deaths
Chinese Muslims
Chinese military personnel
Islam in China
Ethnic Kazakh people
People from Altay Prefecture
20th-century executions by China
Pan-Turkists
Kazakhs in China
Chinese people of Kazakhstani descent
Executed people from Xinjiang
Executed Republic of China people
People executed by China by firing squad